The Center for Autism and Related Disorders, Inc. (CARD) is an organization that provides a range of services based on applied behavior analysis (ABA) for children and adults on the autism spectrum.

CARD was founded in 1990 by Doreen Granpeesheh. The Blackstone Group, a private equity firm, acquired CARD in 2018. Granpeesheh and the management at CARD invested in the company alongside Blackstone, and Granpeesheh remained the CEO until December 2019, when she was replaced by Anthony Kilgore and moved into the role of executive director. In February 2022, Kilgore resigned for undisclosed reasons and was replaced by Jennifer Webster.

Documentary
CARD produced and distributed Recovered: Journeys Through the Autism Spectrum and Back, a 2008 documentary about four children which claims each completely recovered from the autism spectrum as a result of CARD treatment. The film was directed and edited by Michele Jaquis in collaboration with Granpeesheh and won the Best Documentary award at the 2008 Director's Chair Film Festival.

References

External links
 Association for Behavior Analysis Newsletter - Volume 28, 2005, Number 1
 RECOVERED Journeys Through the Autism Spectrum and Back
 IMDB page for RECOVERED Journeys Through the Autism Spectrum and Back

Autism-related organizations in the United States
Organizations based in California
Organizations established in 1990
Mental health organizations in California
1990 establishments in California
Sensory accommodations